Silvia Dionisio (born 28 September 1951) is an Italian actress who appeared in several movies in the 1970s.

Born in Rome, Dionisio made her debut in the world of cinema when she was only 14 years old in the movie Darling. Her career followed with parts in mediocre musical Italian movies, along with singers like Mario Tessuto, Gianni Dei, Little Tony and Mal. On the set of one of these movies she met director Ruggero Deodato, who became her husband. They had a son, Saverio Deodato-Dionisio, who worked as an actor.

In 1970, she played in A Girl Called Jules, a semi-erotic film with several non-nude scenes portraying lesbian sex. She also co-starred in The Young, the Evil and the Savage (1968) and Andy Warhol's Blood for Dracula. In 1975 Dionisio was the protagonist of Ondata di piacere, an erotic thriller set on a small yacht, sco-starring Al Cliver and John Steiner, directed by Deodato. The same year, she played Ugo Tognazzi's lover in Amici miei by Mario Monicelli. In late 1970s she starred in several action or sexy movies.  Riccardo Freda cast her in his last film, Murder Obsession (1981) co-starring Laura Gemser.

In the early 1980s, she left the film industry. Her last appearance was in a liqueur spot directed by Federico Fellini.

Selected filmography 
 Rita the Mosquito (1966)
 Pronto... c'è una certa Giuliana per te (1967)
 The Young, the Evil and the Savage (1968)
 Police Chief Pepe (1969)
 Pensiero d'amore (1969)
 Giacomo Casanova: Childhood and Adolescence (1969)
 A Girl Called Jules (1970)
 The Swinging Confessors (1970)
 The Scalawag Bunch (1971)
 Blood for Dracula (1974)
 My Friends (1975)
 Waves of Lust (1975)
 Live Like a Cop, Die Like a Man (1976)
 Il comune senso del pudore (1976)
 Bloody Payroll (1976)
 Fear in the City (1976)
 Il... Belpaese (1977)
 Il marito in collegio (1977)
 Lobster for Breakfast (1979)
 Terror Express (1979)
 Crimebusters (1976)
 Ciao marziano (1980)
 Murder Obsession (1981)

References

External links

 

1951 births
Living people
Actresses from Rome
Italian film actresses
20th-century Italian actresses